Alburquerque, officially the Municipality of Alburquerque,  is a 5th class municipality in the province of Bohol, Philippines. It had a population of 11,246 people at the time of the 2020 census.

The town is colloquially known as "Albur" for short.

This female python died in 2013, but the mounted creature is still exhibited.

Etymology 

 The town was formerly called "Sagunto", but according to the research of Jess Tirol of Bohol, it was called "Segunto".
 Local folklore holds that Alburquerque was named in honour of Afonso de Albuquerque, the famous Portuguese seafarer and conqueror of Malacca, Sumatra, though it might be odd to use a Portuguese name as a name of a place which is under Spanish control.

Since then, Segunto was changed to Alburquerque and its inhabitants are called Alburanons (Alburquerqueños in Spanish, Alburquerqueans in English).

History 
In 1842, Lady Mariona Iraq asked for a chapel, convent and school to be built in Lo-oc. The construction of these structures gave way to the establishment of Lo-oc as a barrio under the civil and religious jurisdiction of Baclayon and it was renamed Segunto after a town in Cataluña, Spain. In 1868, the town was renamed to Alburquerque.

Geography 

Alburquerque is located in the western part of Bohol,  from Tagbilaran. The land is used as built-up area , agricultural purposes , timberland , mining/quarrying , roads , and landfill site .

Physiography 

The central part of municipality, from the east extending toward northwest is characterized by rolling to moderately steep terrain (18-30% slope), with ground elevation ranging from  amsl. The area in northeastern and southwestern part is characterized by steep terrain (30–50% slope), with ground elevation up to  amsl. The southeastern part is characterized with undulating to rolling terrain (8–18% slope) with ground elevation up to  amsl. The area along the coast is characterized by level to nearly level terrain (0-3% slope), with ground elevation ranging from zero near the coast to  amsl inland.

Alburquerque municipality is covered by hydrosol and three sorts of clay namely, faraon, bolinao and lugo clay. The northern portion of municipality is covered mostly by lugo clay, the southern half portion is mostly covered by faraon and bolinao clay, while hydrosol has a very limited extent along the coast. The municipal area is covered by grassland, coconut, shrubs and built-up area. The northern portion is mostly covered with grass, with exception of small area in the northeast, which is covered with shrubs. The southern portion along the coast is covered with coconut, with a small built-up area in the west.

The whole of Bohol is in Coronas climate type IV, characterized by rainfall evenly distributed over the year. The average annual rainfall is the sum of the average annual rainfall from respective river basin, multiplied with percentage of respective municipal area within respective river basin.

Rivers and river basins 

Several small rivers and creeks, which have their headwaters in the elevated terrain in the northern part, traverse the Alburquerque municipality. These rivers and creeks generally flow in a north to south direction and drain the major part of municipality into Bohol Sea. The only major river basin is the Tagbuane River Basin situated on the eastern part of Alburquerque ( or 94.64% of municipal area). The municipality of Albuquerque has a poorly developed drainage system, due to presence of permeable limestone, which covers most of municipal area and enables infiltration of large portion of effective rainfall into underground. This is characteristic for karstified limestone terrain.

Majority of this water demand (67.4%) in 2030 is for urban population.

Climate

Barangays
Alburquerque comprises 11 barangays, of which six are characterized as coastal (Bahi, San Agustin, Western Poblacion, Eastern Poblacion, Sta Felomina, and Tagbuane) and five as upland (Ponong, Toril, Basacdacu, Cantiguib and Dangay).  Furthermore, the urban population is located in three barangays namely, East and West Poblacion and Ponong.

Demographics

Alburanons speak in Cebuano/Visayas dialect.

Economy

Alburquerque has an average annual income of Php 27,431,496.  The town has a labor force of 37% with an employment rate of 90%. The average family income is Php 4,500/month with an average family expenditures of Php 4,000/month.

The town's major agricultural project is the "Gintong Ani" project in all barangays.  One industry is situated in Eastern Poblacion - the Santisima Trinidad Ice Plant. There are 66 micro-type and 2 cottage-size registered business establishments with total combined investments of Php 1.5 million. The existing tourists destinations are Sta Monica stone church and convent, Sta Fe beach resort, calamay making, ceramics making, salt making, loom weaving, basket and broom-making. The potential attractions are Tarsiers Park, Lourdes Spring, Aquarium Fish, Butterfly Sanctuary.

Cottage industries 

Household weaving takes place in barangay Basacdacu. Buri cloth is made from local young buri leaves for export to Cebu. Midribs of the buri palm leaf are sold for basket making, and bundles of bure stems (pawa) to Tagbuane barangay for broom-making.

Several households use strips of older buri leaves to make spear-head-shaped fans  and smaller fans of  that they sell in Cebu. There are 50 households in the area making brooms from buri stems and bamboo poles.

Salt-making is another source of income for some Alburanons. Production begins when the upland farmers plow their fields for rice production. This is because the "asinderos" salt-makers trade their salt for rice in a barter system, and salt production takes about as long as the growth of the rice it will be exchanged for.

The pottery-making enterprise is located beside the main road in East Poblacion. Clay is dug from a pit near the sea, and mixed with silicate soil before being ground through the large rollers of an electric mill, in a pit beside the pottery works. This is mixed with water and molded into pots of various sizes and shapes on a potter's wheel.

Tourism

The municipality of Alburquerque has natural wonders and micro local industries like the making of calamay, traditional method of manufacturing pottery, and the weaving of raffia using locally made loom.

Municipal Marine Sanctuary 

The Municipal Marine Sanctuary, established in 2000 at brgy Sta Felomina where the beach and the Mangrove Protected Area are located, is set up in the area selected to be fit for the purpose due to its coral cover. The sanctuary contributed to rising fish stocks and corals that had been destroyed by illegal fishers. Bamboo rafts have been put in place to observe the marine ecology. It has been considered as a dive site of the municipality for local and foreign tourist visiting the place. Other activities include trekking up to Tagbuane River passing through a Forestal Reserve Zone.

Heritage

Church and convent

Creation of the parish

Some sources say the parish had its beginning as a visita in 1842 when a chapel was built under the direction of the parish priest of Baclayon. The parish advocated to Santa Monica was canonically established on 18 June 1869, following royal approval given in November 1868. During the Spanish colonial era, the Augustinian Recollect friars administered the parish.

Creation of the church

Up to the 1880s, the parish church was more like a huge shed. Although it boasted three aisles, its walls were only of tabique. The present church of coral stone was commenced shortly afterwards, utilizing the same three-aisled plan. However, the upper portions, especially the tower over the façade, were completed during the first half of this century. On examination it becomes clear that the link between the church and the casa parroquial was planned along a grander scale, but never finished. The grotto at the back of the courtyard between the two structures hides a ruin which may be of another unfinished arcade.

Ray Francia signed the church's interior ceiling painting on one side of the choir loft. Another section, now vanished, showed that the painting was carried out from 12 April to 3 August 1932. As regards the church bells, amongst them in the quadrangular tower are three bells, inscribed with the patron saints of the parish (Santa Monica, San Agustin, and "Calipay" or Joy). Dated 1866, two years before the ecclesiastical recognition of the parish, the bells are testimonies to the anxiety of the community in becoming an independent parish.

As to the casa parroquial, the year 1876 is etched over the porta maior. However, in the center of the entrance arches to the steps, the year 1884 could be read until recently.

The church was severely damaged in the 2013 earthquake.

Local government

 Mayor: Don Ritchie P. Buates
 Vice Mayor: Alexis Fernan R. Simeon
 SB Members:
 Dagohoy N. Samar
 Jose M. Dompol
 Ritchel B. Lim
 Leonor R. Buates
 Elias Q. Jipos
 Nesio M. Gonzaga
 Pal A. Jubac

Infrastructure

Alburquerque's road network is classified into:
 national 
 provincial 
 municipal 
 barangay .
It has one bridge, the 39 L.M. Bridge to brgy Tagbuane. The power supply is currently distributed by the Bohol Electric Cooperative I (BOHECO I) which served a total of 1,281 households in the 11 barangays. The main source of potable water supply is groundwater.

The municipality has one local port situated in Western Poblacion, which serves local fishermen as well as other fishing vessels and cargo vessels in transporting equipment and raw materials from other neighboring provinces. It is fitted with proper lighting and equipment. The municipal LGU as well as the barangay officials ensure the safety, peace and order situation and proper maintenance of the port.

Waterworks 

One of the biggest projects of the present administration is to provide its constituents with a sufficient potable water supply. Almost 80% of the barangay in the municipality currently has water connections.

Education

Ensuring quality education to the people is also one of the top concerns of the local officials. The LGU assisted in determining and developing appropriate actions that would address the educational needs of the Alburanons in terms of budgetary allocations, maintenance of facilities and policies concerning education.

Alburquerque has one public secondary school, San Roque High School. It has four elementary schools for intermediate level and three primary schools. It has also a total of 11 day care centers, one center in each barangay and one private pre-school. The number of teachers in the municipality is only 63 and the teacher student ratio in elementary is 1:24 and 1:43 in secondary level.

Notes

References

Sources

External links 

 [ Philippine Standard Geographic Code]
 Bohol
 Municipality of Alburquerque
 Alburquerque Bohol 

Municipalities of Bohol